Niso Abdulloeva (born 24 December 2003) is a Tajik footballer who plays as a defender for Tajik women's football championship's club Zeboniso and the Tajikistan women's national team. 
She is also a futsal player and play for the Tajikistan women's national futsal team.

Club career
Abdulloeva has played as a defender for Zeboniso.

Honours

Tajikistan

Zeboniso
Tajikistan women's Higher League:
  Champions: 2020, 2022
  Runners-up: 2021

Individual

References

2003 births
Living people
Tajikistani women's footballers
Women's association football forwards
Tajikistan women's international footballers